Niels Brouzes (born 3 February 1981) is a French former professional road bicycle racer.

Major results

1999
 3rd Chrono des Nations Juniors
2000
 1st Chrono des Nations Espoirs
2001
 1st  Road race, National Under-23 Road Championships
 1st Stage 3 Circuit des Ardennes
 2nd Overall Ruban Granitier Breton
2004
 2nd Mi-Août Bretonne 4
2005
 5th Tour de Vendée
 6th Tour du Jura
 6th Grand Prix de la Ville de Nogent-sur-Oise
2007
 1st Tour du Finistère
 1st Paris–Mantes-en-Yvelines
 5th Classic Loire Atlantique
2008
 1st Overall Ronde de l'Oise
 8th Duo Normand
2009
 8th Paris–Troyes

External links 

 
 
 
 

French male cyclists
1981 births
Living people
People from Drancy
Sportspeople from Seine-Saint-Denis
Cyclists from Île-de-France